Paul Keegan (born 30 December 1972) is an Irish professional footballer. Keegan was the first Irishman to play in Major League Soccer in the United States.

Keegan joined St Patrick's Athletic from schoolboy football team Crumlin United, where he broke the scoring record for the club with 33 goals in 29 games in 2001. In 1992, after his first year with Pat's and Brian Kerr's successful side, Keegan accepted the offer of a soccer scholarship by Boston College where he learned his trade under the tutelage of renowned coach Ed Kelly. Keegan represented his country in the World University Games in Buffalo, USA in 1992. After a successful college career, which seen him win Big East Rookie of the Year, Big East Player of the Year and All American honours twice, Keegan was drafted by the New England Revolution as their number one pick in the first ever MLS college draft in 1996 by Frank Stapelton. Keegan stayed with the 'Revs' for 5 successful seasons until 2000. In his last season with the Revs, Keegan was honored with Bostons prestigious 'Sportsman of the Year Award' for outstanding service to the community. In 2000 Keegan played four times for the Boston Bulldogs in the US A-League to help recover from an ACL knee injury.

Keegan got his first taste of League of Ireland football when he was loaned to St Patrick's Athletic in 1999 because of the long off season in the MLS. Playing mostly off the substitutes bench, Keegan helped Pats secure their second successive league championship. At the end of his loan spell he returned to New England. The following year he returned home to Ireland and joined Bray Wanderers and his performances there earned a move to title chasing Bohemians in 2002. Bohemians won the league in Keegan's first season as he developed a great relationship with league leading scorer, Glen Crowe. He won the goal of the year award for his famous over head kick versus Bray Wanderers. In 2004, Keegan joined Longford Town and ended the season by scoring the winning goal in the FAI Cup final. Keegan joined his childhood team, St Patrick's Athletic for the second time as manager John McDonnell looked for experienced strikers to add to his young team.

After a year back with St Patrick's and an outstanding year in partnership with Trevor Molloy which seen them score 35 goals between them, he moved to Motherwell in January 2007 for an undisclosed fee and to be with his family.

He moved to Scotland's Partick Thistle in August 2007, he joined Dumbarton in the Scottish Football League Third Division. Keegan helped the Sons to win the Third Division championship in May 2009. In his last year of professional football, Keegan signed for Airdrie United on 22 July 2009.

Honours
Bray Wanderers
 League of Ireland Division 1: 2001

Bohemians
 League of Ireland: 2003

Longford Town
 FAI Cup: 2004
 League of Ireland Cup: 2004

Dumbarton
 Scottish Third Division: 2009

References

External links
Paul Keegan @ stpatsfc.com
New England Revolution place Keegan on waiver
Keegan chosen 6th overall in 1996 college Draft
Paul Keegan's WTFC.net player profile

1972 births
Living people
Association football forwards
Association football midfielders
Association footballers from County Dublin
Beith Juniors F.C. players
Bohemian F.C. players
Boston College Eagles men's soccer players
Boston Bulldogs (soccer) players
Bray Wanderers F.C. players
Connecticut Wolves players
Dumbarton F.C. players
Republic of Ireland association footballers
St Patrick's Athletic F.C. players
Longford Town F.C. players
Major League Soccer players
New England Revolution players
Seacoast United Phantoms players
League of Ireland players
Motherwell F.C. players
Partick Thistle F.C. players
Scottish Premier League players
Scottish Football League players
Worcester Wildfire players
A-League (1995–2004) players
USL Second Division players
New England Revolution draft picks
Crumlin United F.C. players